Eunápolis is a municipality in Bahia with 114,396 people. The town was founded in 1988. In 1996, the city was made the seat of the Roman Catholic Diocese of Eunápolis.

References

External links
Eunápolis's official site

Municipalities in Bahia